Universal Love is the third  album released by Philadelphia International Records houseband MFSB.

Includes a cover of The Nite-Liters's 1971 single "K-Jee" which was included in the 1977 movie and soundtrack Saturday Night Fever.

Track listing

Personnel
MFSB
Bobby Eli, Norman Harris, Reggie Lucas, Roland Chambers, T.J. Tindall – guitar
Anthony Jackson, Ron Baker – bass
Leon Huff, Lenny Pakula, Eddie Green, Harold "Ivory" Williams – keyboards
Earl Young, Karl Chambers, Norman Farrington – drums
Larry Washington – percussion
Vincent Montana, Jr. – vibraphone
Zach Zachery, Tony Williams – saxophone
Don Renaldo and his Strings and Horns

Charts

Singles

References

External links
 

1975 albums
MFSB albums
Albums produced by Kenneth Gamble
Albums produced by Leon Huff
Albums produced by Bobby Martin
Albums arranged by Bobby Martin
Albums recorded at Sigma Sound Studios
Philadelphia International Records albums